Laurel may refer to:

Plants
 Lauraceae, the laurel family
 Laurel (plant), including a list of trees and plants known as laurel

People
 Laurel (given name), people with the given name
 Laurel (surname), people with the surname
 Laurel (musician), British indie musician Laurel Arnell-Cullen (born 1994)

Places

United States
 Laurel, California, a ghost town
 Laurel, Oakland, California, a neighborhood of Oakland
 Laurel, Delaware, a town
 Laurel, Florida, a census-designated place
 Laurel, Indiana, a town
 Laurel Township, Franklin County, Indiana
 Laurel, Iowa, a city
 Laurel County, Kentucky
 Laurel River, Kentucky
 Laurel, Maryland, a city
 Laurel, Mississippi, a city
 Laurel micropolitan area, Mississippi
 Laurel, Montana, a city
 Laurel, Nebraska, a city
 Laurel, New York, a census-designated place
 Laurel, North Carolina, an unincorporated community
 Laurel, Ohio, an unincorporated community
 Laurel Township, Hocking County, Ohio
 Laurel, Oregon, an unincorporated community
 Laurel Highlands, Pennsylvania
 Laurel Hill (Pennsylvania)
 Laurel Lake (Cumberland County, Pennsylvania)
 Laurel, Tennessee, an unincorporated settlement
 Laurel, Virginia, a census-designated place
 Laurel, Washington, an unincorporated community
 Laurel, Barbour County, West Virginia, an unincorporated community
 Laurel Lake (Teton County, Wyoming), in Grand Teton National Park
 Laurel Mountain (disambiguation)

Canada
 Laurel, Edmonton, Alberta, a neighbourhood
 Laurel, a hamlet in the township of Amaranth, Ontario
 Laurel, a community in Wentworth-Nord, Quebec

Elsewhere
 Laurel, Batangas, Philippines, a third-class municipality
 2865 Laurel, an asteroid

Ships
 , the name of several Royal Navy ships
 Laurel-class post ship, six ships used by the Royal Navy during the Napoleonic Wars
 , a Union Navy steamer
 , a 1943 Cypriot ship scrapped in 1969

Other uses
 Laurel (English coin)
 The Laurel, a proposed skyscraper in Philadelphia, Pennsylvania, US
 Laurel station (disambiguation), stations of the name
 Dudley Spencer House, also known as Laurel, designed by Frank Lloyd Wright
 Laurel Films, a film production company
 Nissan Laurel, a car
 Laurel Awards
 Laurel High School (disambiguation)
 Laurel (LDS Church), the name for teenage members of the LDS Young Women's organization
"Laurel", a song by Goldfrapp from Tales of Us
 Laurel and Yanny, an acoustic illusion that went viral on social media in 2018.

See also 
 Laureles (disambiguation)
 Laurel Fork (disambiguation)
 Laurel wreath
 
 Laure (disambiguation)
 Laurell, a name
 Laurels (Laurus nobilis), in the flowering plant family Lauraceae
 Lauryl, a dodecyl hydrocarbon chain